Onagrodes recurva is a moth in the family Geometridae. It is found on Seram and on New Guinea.

References

Moths described in 1907
Eupitheciini